Margo is the screen and stage name of Margo Timon (née Tucker), a magic performer and actress who had a starring slot in the NBC network television special The World's Most Dangerous Magic II. She worked with the duo The Pendragons.

Life and career
Margo is the offspring of an established magic family. Her mother is award-winning magician Frances Willard. Margo's father is Texan newspaper editor Glenn Tucker. Her younger sister Hannah is married to close-up magic specialist and lecturer Michael Ammar.

As an assistant with The Pendragons, Margo appeared on The Tonight Show and the World Magic Awards. In 1999 she was picked by producer Gary Ouellet to be one of the stars of the second of his World's Most Dangerous Magic specials. Ouellet and his team created for her the predicament escape trick "Rat Attack", in which she was shackled into a coffin-like box which was then filled with rats and she then magically escaped. She studied acting and had small roles in the television series Night Court and The Young and the Restless.

Marriage
In 1996, she married James Timon who was head of entertainment at Universal Studios. The couple first met because Timon had hired The Pendragons for a run at Universal and Margo was working with them.

References

American magicians
American television actresses
American soap opera actresses
Living people
Place of birth missing (living people)
Year of birth missing (living people)
21st-century American women